Michael Jackson (born July 31, 1949) is an American former professional basketball player. After a collegiate career at the Cal State University Los Angeles, Jackson was selected in both the 1972 ABA draft and 1972 NBA draft.

Jackson played at Hancock Junior College (now called Allan Hancock College) to start his collegiate career. He was named a junior college All-American before enrolling at Cal State Los Angeles to play the final two years of his collegiate career.

References

1949 births
Living people
Allan Hancock Bulldogs men's basketball players
Allentown Jets players
American men's basketball players
Basketball players from Washington, D.C.
Cal State Los Angeles Golden Eagles men's basketball players
Houston Rockets draft picks
Memphis Tams players
Power forwards (basketball)
Utah Stars draft picks
Utah Stars players
Virginia Squires players